Crassinella is a genus of bivalves belonging to the family Crassatellidae.

The genus has almost cosmopolitan distribution.

Species
Species:

Crassatellites acutus 
Crassatellites aldrichianus 
Crassatellites bowdenensis 
Crassatellites guppyi 
Crassatellites midiensis 
Crassatellites triangulatus 
Crassinella adamsi 
Crassinella coxa 
Crassinella dupliniana 
Crassinella ecuadoriana 
Crassinella johnsoni 
Crassinella lata 
Crassinella lunulata 
Crassinella maldonadoensis 
Crassinella marplatensis 
Crassinella martinicensis 
Crassinella minor 
Crassinella nuculiformis 
Crassinella pacifica 
Crassinella pygmaea
Crassinella skoglundae 
Crassinella variablis 
Crassinella varians 
Crassinella xena

References

Crassatellidae
Bivalve genera